Socialist Party has been the name of several political parties in India, all of which have their roots in the Congress Socialist Party during the freedom struggle.

Background 
Socialism had a late appearance in Indian politics and this was attributed to a preoccupation on the part of political activists with the independence movement. Differences in class, political perspectives, and economic objectives were set aside in favor of securing freedom from the British colonial rule. Specifically, socialist doctrines were even seen as a liability due to its theme of class conflict, which could have weakened national forces in their struggle for freedom.

Once the socialist movement emerged, the Indian concept turned out to be different due to its rejection of the orthodox Marxist dogma or the so-called scientific socialist doctrines that focus on the dictatorship of the proletariat. The Indian model holds that socialism cannot be achieved through the State apparatus. One of its rationales stated that "If the State is looked upon as the sole agent for social reconstruction, we get nothing but a regimented society in which the State is all powerful and popular initiative is extinct and the individual is made a cog in a vast inhuman machine." Indian socialism became aligned with the Gandhian principle that right outcomes would only be achieved through the right means. Overall, it has clear links to traditional Indian thought and philosophical traditions.

The former Congress Socialist Party 

The original Socialist Party had its roots in the Congress Socialist Party (CSP), the socialist caucus of the Indian National Congress, which fused in 1948 with the Bolshevik-Leninist Party of India, Ceylon and Burma (BLPI). Hector Abhayavardhana of the BLPI became General Secretary of the new party. The Socialist Party was founded not long after India's independence when Jayprakash Narayan, Rambriksh Benipuri, Basawon Singh (Sinha), Acharya Narendra Dev led the CSP out of Congress. At the time, Congress's leader Jawaharlal Nehru held positions that were widely admired by the rank and file of the CSP.

Socialist Party of India 

Despite Jayaprakash Narayan's personal popularity, the Socialist Party won only 12 seats at the 1951 Indian general election, and its electoral fortunes did not improve. The SP merged with the Kisan Mazdoor Praja Party, which was formed by J.B. Kripalani, to form the Praja Socialist Party. It was led by Akula Purushotham in Andhra Pradesh.

Praja Socialist Party

The Praja Socialist Party was an Indian political party in existence from 1952 to 1972. It was founded when the Socialist Party, led by Jayprakash Narayan, Acharya Narendra Deva, Ramvriksh Benipuri and Basawon Singh (Sinha), merged with the Kisan Mazdoor Praja Party led by J.B. Kripalani (formerly a close associate of Jawaharlal Nehru). A section led by Rammanohar Lohia broke from the party in 1955, resuming the name "Socialist Party".

In 1972, SSP was reunited with PSP, forming the Socialist Party.

In 1974 and 1975, JP led satyagrahas against the government of Indira Gandhi and called for a 'Total Revolution' in the countryside. In response, Indira declared the two-year State of Emergency under which her own power was consolidated and JP was jailed. At that time, George Fernandes, chairman of the Socialist Party of India, who had faced prosecution for conspiracy against the government of Prime Minister Indira Gandhi, sought to obtain funding from the U.S. Central Intelligence Agency and the French government in order to organize underground sabotage activities. After an initial request to seek funding from the French government was turned down, U.S. diplomatic cables showed that he was "prepared to accept money from the CIA".

After the Emergency, the Socialist Party joined with a number of other groups to form the Bharatiya Lok Dal, which fused in 1977 into Janata Party as an omnibus opposition to Congress Party rule.

Samyukta Socialist Party

The Samyukta Socialist Party was a political party in India from 1964 to 1972.  SSP was formed through a split in the Praja Socialist Party (PSP) in 1964. In 1965, Ram Manohar Lohia merged his Socialist Party (Lohia) with SSP. In 1972, SSP was reunited with PSP, forming the Socialist Party. The General Secretary of the SSP from 1969 to 1971 was George Fernandes.

Samajwadi Party
The Samajwadi Party, (Hindi translation: Socialist Party), is a political party which draws its lineage from the Janata Dal, Janata Party, Lok Dal and eventually Socialist Party as well.

Socialist Party (India), 2011

In 2011, several socialist groups and individuals formed the Socialist Party (India), which intends to carry forward the legacy of the Socialist Party formed in 1948. The party was formed through a resolution passed by Mr. Pannalal Surana at the foundation conference on 28 May 2011, under the chairmanship of Prof. Keshav Rao Jadhav.

Party National Conference held  at Wardha in Gujarath on 28–30 September 2021 elected Adv Thampan Thomas Ex MP from Kerala as president and Dr.Sandeep Pandey of  UP as General Secretary.

See also 

 List of political parties in India

References

Socialist parties in India